Polish–Ottoman War (1672–1676) was a conflict between the Polish–Lithuanian Commonwealth and the Ottoman Empire, as a precursor of the Great Turkish War. It ended in 1676 with the Treaty of Żurawno and the Commonwealth ceding control of most of its Ukraine territories to the Ottomans.

Prelude

The causes of the Polish-Ottoman War of 1672–1676 can be traced to 1666. Petro Doroshenko Hetman of Zaporizhian Host, aiming to gain control of Ukraine but facing defeats from other factions struggling over control of that region, in a final bid to preserve his power in Ukraine, signed a treaty with Sultan Mehmed IV in 1669 that recognized the Cossack Hetmanate as a vassal of the Ottoman Empire.

In the meantime, Commonwealth forces were trying to put down unrest in Ukraine, but were weakened by decades long wars (Khmelnytsky Uprising, The Deluge and Russo-Polish War (1654–1667)). Trying to capitalize on that weakness, Tatars, who commonly raided across the Commonwealth borders in search of loot and plunder, invaded, this time allying themselves with Cossacks under hetman Doroshenko. They were however stopped by Commonwealth forces under hetman John Sobieski, who stopped their first push (1666–67), defeating them several times, and finally gaining an armistice after the Battle of Podhajce.

In 1670, however, hetman Doroshenko tried once again to take over Ukraine, and in 1671 Khan of Crimea, Adil Giray, supportive of the Commonwealth, was replaced with a new one, Selim I Giray, by the Ottoman sultan. Selim entered into an alliance with the Doroshenko's Cossacks; but again like in 1666–67 the Cossack-Tatar forces were dealt defeats by Sobieski. Selim then renewed his oath of allegiance to the Ottoman Sultan and pleaded for assistance, to which the Sultan agreed. Thus an irregular border conflict escalated into a regular war in 1671, as the Ottoman Empire was now prepared to send its regular units onto the battlefield in a bid to try to gain control of that region for itself.

The first phase (1672)

Ottoman forces, numbering 80,000 men and led by Grand Vizier Köprülü Fazıl Ahmed and Ottoman sultan Mehmed IV, invaded Polish Ukraine in August, took the Commonwealth fortress at Kamieniec Podolski and besieged Lwów. Unprepared for war, and torn by internal conflict between the king Michael I and the szlachta nobility, the Commonwealth Sejm could not act to raise taxes and gather a larger army. Its representatives were forced to sign the Peace of Buczacz in October that year, which ceded to the Ottomans the Commonwealth part of Ukraine (the Right-bank Bracław Voivodeship, Podole Voivodeship  and part of Kiev Voivodeship; Left-bank Ukraine was already controlled by Russia since the Treaty of Andrusovo of 1667) and promised an annual tribute of 22,000 ducats.

The second phase (1673–1676)

Instead of ratifying the peace treaty, the Commonwealth Sejm, with most of the deputies finally united by anger due to the territorial losses and the demeaning tribute (which could in fact be seen as reducing the Commonwealth to Ottomans' vassal) finally raised taxes for a new army (of about 37,000 strong was raised) and increased the Cossack register to 40,000. Hetman John Sobieski led a military campaign against the Ottomans and dealt several defeats to the Ottomans; of which the battle of Khotyn was the largest; next he took control of the Moldavia territory and most of disputed Ukrainian lands. That year king Michael I of Poland died, and in recognition of his victories and dedication, John Sobieski was elected King of the Commonwealth in 1674.

Over the next year, however, the Polish forces were subject to attrition, as the Sejm again refused to raise taxes and pay the army, resulting in mass desertions of unpaid soldiery. The Polish problems were further aggravated by the incompetent leadership of hetman Michał Kazimierz Pac, who obstructed Sobieski's leadership, while the Ottomans continued to receive reinforcements. Nonetheless in 1674 the Commonwealth resumed the offensive, taking advantage of a new Russo-Turkish conflict that year, and the Polish-Ottoman war remained undecided. Sobieski's force of 6,000 defeated 20,000 Turks and Tatars under Ibrahim Shyshman in the battle of Lwow in August 1675.  Even after the Battle of Trembowla, the Sejm still refused his pleas for more funds and a larger army.

In 1676, after Sobieski's 16,000 withstood the two-week siege of Żurawno, by 100,000 men under Ibrahim Pasha, a new peace treaty was signed, the Treaty of Żurawno.  The peace treaty partially reversing those from Buczacz: the Ottomans kept approximately two thirds of the territories they gained in 1672, and the Commonwealth no longer was obliged to pay any kind of tribute to the Empire; a large number of Polish prisoners were released by the Ottomans.

Aftermath

The Sejm rejected the treaty, through the actions of Austrian diplomats and Pope Innocent XI.  Sobieski also was forced to reduce his army from 30,000 to 12,000 men. 
 
The war showed the increasing weakness and disorder of the Commonwealth, who by the second half of the 17th century had started its gradual decline that would culminate a century later with the partitions of Poland. The unruly Sejm, paralyzed by liberum veto and foreign bribery, was dominated by politicians who thought in short term gains only and constantly refused the funds to raise an army, as it appeared that most of the Commonwealth would not be ravaged by the Ottoman armies. Even after the unfavourable Buczacz treaty, which convinced the Sejm to raise the taxes,  once initial successes were achieved, the majority of the Sejm again couldn't be convinced to keep up the pressure on the enemy; soldiers were left unpaid and desertions on a mass scale negatively affected the Polish cause. This apparent inability to defend itself, also seen in the other recent and future conflicts the Commonwealth was involved in, increasingly invited foreign forces to prey on the Commonwealth.

On the Polish side the fighting was done mostly by a force privately financed by John Sobieski. He gained reputation as an able, courageous commander and a patriot, having invested part of his personal fortune in the defense of the Commonwealth. In 1674 he was elected King of Poland and ruled now as John III. Sobieski's reputation also preceded him in the Ottoman Empire, and his victory several years later at the battle of Vienna would ensure his reputation as the top commander fighting the Ottomans — however even he would not be able to stop the Commonwealth from decline and introduce reforms that would save the country.

The Commonwealth did regain the territories lost in this war after the Polish–Ottoman War (1683–1699) in 1699 Treaty of Karlowitz, but that was one of the last of its victories.

Battles
Battle of Ładyżyno (or Battle of Czetwertynówka) (18 July 1672)
Battle of Humanie (1672)
Siege of Kamieniec Podolski (18–27 August 1672)
Battle of Korc (1672)
Battle of Krasnobród (5–6 October 1672)
Battle of Narol (6 October 1672)
Battle of Niemirów (7 October 1672)
Battle of Komarno (9 October 1672)
Battle of Petranka (14 October 1672)
Battle of Kałusz (1672)
Battle of Khotyn (11 November 1673)
Battle of Lesienice near Lwów (22 August 1675)
Battle of Trembowla (20 September – 11 October 1675)
Battle of Wojniłowo (24 September 1676)
Battle of Żurawno (25 September – 14 October 1676)

In popular culture
The Polish-Ottoman War had a major effect on Poland. Fire in the Steppe is a historical fiction novel, set in the 17th century in the Polish–Lithuanian Commonwealth during the Polish–Tatar and Polish–Ottoman Wars.

Colonel Wolodyjowski is a Polish historical drama film directed by Jerzy Hoffman. The film is based on the novel Fire in the Steppe, the last part in The Trilogy of Henryk Sienkiewicz.

References

Bibliography 

Polish-Ottoman War, 1672–1676
Polish Warfare: The Turkish and Tartar Wars 1667–1676 parts 7 and 8
 Wojny polsko-tureckie , Encyklopedia WIEM
 Viorel Panaite, "On Ottoman-Polish Diplomatic Relations", Asian Studies. International Journal for Asian Studies (II/2001), 
 Stanford Jay Shaw, Ezel Kural Shaw, History of the Ottoman Empire and Modern Turkey, Cambridge University Press, 1977, Google Print, p.213

External links
 Edward Krysciak, Wojny polsko-tureckie w drugiej połowie XVII wieku, Portal historicus.pl
 Wojna 1672–1676

1670s conflicts
Polish–Ottoman wars
Wars involving Wallachia
Wars involving Moldavia
Warfare of the Early Modern period
Poland–Turkey relations
1670s in Europe
1670s in the Ottoman Empire
Military history of Ukraine